Riccarton may refer to:

New Zealand
 Riccarton, New Zealand, a suburb of Christchurch
 Riccarton (New Zealand electorate), the electorate named after it
 The location of Riccarton Race Course
 a locality on the Taieri Plains in Otago

Scotland
 Riccarton, East Ayrshire, a parish and old village in Ayrshire, today considered part of Kilmarnock
 Riccarton, Edinburgh, a locality to the south-west of Edinburgh, the site of Heriot-Watt University's main campus
 Riccarton Tower, at the beginning of Riccarton Burn, the valley of Clan Crozier, Liddesdale
 Riccarton Junction railway station, a former station